Macroschisma africanum is a species of sea snail, a marine gastropod mollusk in the family Fissurellidae, the keyhole limpets and slit limpets.

Distribution
This species occurs in the following locations:
 Mascarene Basin
 Mauritius

References

External links
 Herbert D.G. (2015). An annotated catalogue and bibliography of the taxonomy, synonymy and distribution of the Recent Vetigastropoda of South Africa (Mollusca). Zootaxa. 4049(1): 1-98
 To Encyclopedia of Life
 To World Register of Marine Species

africanum
Gastropods described in 1932